Alexander Randal Mark McDonnell, 9th Earl of Antrim,  (3 February 1935 – 21 July 2021), known as Alexander Dunluce, was a Northern Irish landowner, peer, artist, and art restorer. 

He lived mostly at his ancestral home, Glenarm Castle, County Antrim, Northern Ireland. As his titles were in the peerage of Ireland, he did not sit in the House of Lords.

The son of the 8th Earl of Antrim (1911–1977) and his artist wife Angela Sykes (1911–1984), as the heir apparent to his father's titles he was styled Viscount Dunluce from his birth until 1977.

Early life
Brought up as a Roman Catholic, Antrim was educated at Downside School, Christ Church, Oxford, and the Ruskin School of Drawing & Fine Art. He subsequently worked as an art restorer for the Tate Gallery, holding the posts of Keeper of Conservation, 1975–1995, and Director of Collection Services, 1990–1995. He was also a Director of Ulster Television from 1982 to 2000, Chairman of Northern Salmon Co. Ltd, from 2000 to 2008, and Prime Warden of the Worshipful Company of Fishmongers for the year 1995–1996.

He was the first to spot the potential of Bankside Power Station as a site for the Tate Modern.

Family
Antrim was married twice and had three children, by his first marriage: 
 Lady Flora Pennybacker (born 1963)
 Lady Alice McDonnell (born 1964)
 Randal Alexander McDonnell, 10th Earl of Antrim (born 1967); m. Aurora Gunn.
And from his second marriage: 
 Lady Rachel McDonnell (born 1978)

His younger brother is the artist Hector McDonnell.

Death
Lord Antrim died on 21 July 2021, at the age of 86 after a short illness (sepsis). His funeral was held at the Our Lady of Immaculate Conception Church in Glenarm.

Appointments
Director of Ulster Television (UTV)
Fellow of the Royal Society of Arts
Member of the Marine Biological Association
Patron of the Arts Society of Ulster

Sources

The Complete Peerage, volume 14 (1998)
Burke's Peerage and Baronetage, 106th Edition (1999)
9th Earl of Antrim at thepeerage.com

1935 births
2021 deaths
People educated at Downside School
Prime Wardens of the Worshipful Company of Fishmongers
Alumni of Christ Church, Oxford
Earls of Antrim